Ten Outstanding Young Persons of the World (TOYP) program serves to formally recognize young people who excel in their chosen fields and exemplify the best attributes of the world's young people.  The program is sponsored by Junior Chamber International (JCI).

Young men and women may be nominated in one of ten categories. An international panel of judges then selects up to ten honorees, who are chosen from all of the nominations, regardless of category entered.  Past recipients have included sportspersons, those who have contributed to society in various ways, and those who have overcome handicaps.

Nominees are often submitted through the Junior Chamber organizations in their home countries.  Each national organization typically has a Ten Outstanding Young Persons program, which recognizes young people who exemplify the best attributes of that country's young people.

The international awards began in 1983 and were modelled after the programs sponsored by the national organizations.

Categories
 Business, economic, and/or entrepreneurial accomplishment
 Political, legal, and/or governmental affairs
 Academic leadership and/or accomplishment
 Cultural achievement
 Moral and/or environmental leadership
 Contribution to children, world peace, and/or human rights
 Humanitarian and/or voluntary leadership
 Scientific and/or technological development
 Personal improvement and/or accomplishment
 Medical innovation

See also
 List of recipients of Ten Outstanding Young Persons of the World
 Ten Outstanding Young Americans (United States national program)

References 

Junior Chamber International
Awards honoring children or youth